Christian Georg Kohlrausch re-discovered the Discus - see Discus throw. Since the end of the Ancient Olympic Games, the discus was only known from  sculpture like the Discobolus and drawings. The exact dimensions (shape), weight and  the technique of throwing had not been recorded and handed down.

In 1880, Christian Georg Kohlrausch was appointed as gymnastics teacher at the Klosterschule "Pädagogium zum Kloster Unser Lieben Frauen" (grammar school "Our Ladies"), a former cloister school in Magdeburg. He taught here until his retirement in 1913. He became known around the World through his studies and experiments with pupils to re-discover the discus and the technique of throwing it. He was so well known in Germany at the time that he would receive letters from around the World addressed simply to "Christian Kohlrausch, Germany".

Christian Kohlrausch examined what was known about this key Olympic discipline. He worked with students to re-discover once more the shape and dimensions of the discus. During sport lessons in and outside of school he developed and refined the technique of throwing and turned it once more into a competitive sport discipline. Due to his work the Discus throw was included in the very first Olympic Games of Modern Times in 1896.

Around 1880/81, he introduced "games in the open air" ("Spiele im Freien") to his school in Magdeburg and in this helped to introduce Football in Germany, which is mostly attributed to Konrad Koch with whom he collaborated. In the early days (until 1893) the rules of Football were based on Rugby.

External links 
 1881 … Christian Georg Kohlrausch demonstrated .... for the first time a football match in Magdeburg according to the rules of Prof. Dr. Konrad Koch
 1880: … Christian Georg Kohlrausch … organises ..... „Spiele im Freien“ "Games in the open air". .... and also introduced the English game of Rugby at the school. - See page 6 - "up to 1900".
 FAZ, 07.08.2012, Michael Reinsch, London - "Robert Harting, like a hero from A Comic" - Between historic reference and modern motivation: The Discus-World champion Robert Harting found his way - as well to the Olympic Finals.  .... The gymnastic teacher Christian Georg Kohlrausch from Magdeburg could help. He reconstructed the discipline known since 700 B.C. from drawings and sculptures like the Discobolus, exhibited at the British Museum in the Olympiastadt (2012). 1882 he published his „Instructions for the Introduction of  Discus throwing“. ....

Literature 
 Jahrbücher für Philologie und Paedagogik, 1880, Turnspiele. Bedürfnis und Einführung
 Turn-Zeitung, No.16, 1880, Die Frühjahrsbewegung
 Turn-Zeitung, No.40, 1880, Die Einführung des Diskus auf unseren Turnplätzen
 Der Diskus. Anleitung zur Einführung des Diskuswerfens auf unseren Turn- und Spielplätzen für alle Turner, besonders für Turnlehrer und -schüler höherer Unterrichtsanstalten, Leipzig 1882
 Das Turnen in Magdeburg. Ein historischer Abriß der Entwicklung der Leibesübungen in Magdeburg, 1892
 Deutsches Turnen. Vorträge und Lehrpläne, 1908

German athletics coaches
German schoolteachers
1851 births
1934 deaths
People from Harz (district)
History of sport in Germany